Ghost Lion, known in Japan as , is a 1989 role-playing video game released by Kemco for the Nintendo Entertainment System.

Gameplay

Plot
Ghost Lion begins when a ghostly White Lion attacked Maria's village. A hero appeared and drove the lion away, but Maria's parents wanted to find out where the Lion came from and what its purpose was. They set out on a journey, and never returned. The player takes control when, one day, Maria decides to go look for them. As she begins her journey, a bridge gives way beneath her, and she is washed away by a strong river current. She awakens in a strange new world and must find her lost parents and a way home, while looking for the mysterious White Lion.

Reception
Upon the game's release, the game received a total score of 25/40 from the four reviewers at Famitsu. Nintendo Power called the game a "good, solid entry in the role-playing category". The review found the game similar to the Dragon Quest series, and made note of its female heroine as the game's "biggest difference".

Retrospectively, Game Informer gave it a score of 6.5/10, opining that "the ability to summon spirits is neat, but the game's bland art style and repetitive nature fail to amount to anything worth mentioning. If it weren't for the chick who looks like a dude on the [North American] cover, Legend of the Ghost Lion would be lost to obscurity forever." In an article about Dragon Quest clones, the staff of 1UP.com called it "a strange game where every part that wasn't taken directly from Dragon Quest was straight out of a fever dream."

References

External links

1989 video games
Fantasy video games
Kemco games
Nintendo Entertainment System games
Nintendo Entertainment System-only games
Role-playing video games
Single-player video games
Video games developed in Japan
Video games featuring female protagonists
Lions in popular culture